State Road 68 in the U.S. State of Indiana is a  route in Gibson, Posey, Spencer and Warrick counties.

Route description
State Road 68 begins in New Harmony at State Road 69 and runs east, passing through the towns of Poseyville, Cynthiana, Haubstadt, Lynnville and Selvin.  State Road 68 nearly parallels Interstate 64, but although it passes over the interstate twice, there is no direct interchange. However, as of 2008, it now has an interchange with Interstate 69, making it one of the few roads in the state to cross both the state level equivalent and the Interstate equivalent, in this case being 69. It ends at US 231 in the town of Dale.

Major intersections

References

External links

068
Transportation in Gibson County, Indiana
Transportation in Posey County, Indiana
Transportation in Spencer County, Indiana
Transportation in Warrick County, Indiana